Alsop en le Dale railway station was  opened in 1899 near Alsop en le Dale and Alstonefield, villages in Derbyshire southeast of Buxton.

It was on the Ashbourne Line built by the LNWR as a branch from the Cromford and High Peak Railway (which ran from Whaley Bridge to Cromford) at Parsley Hay. At some time it was known as "Alsop en le Dale for Alstonefield."

History

Opened by the London and North Western Railway, it became part of the London, Midland and Scottish Railway during the Grouping of 1923. The station then passed on to the London Midland Region of British Railways on nationalisation in 1948. It was then closed to regular traffic by the British Transport Commission and finally for excursions by the British Railways Board.

The line

From Hurdlow the line had been fairly easily graded, but at Alsop Moor, roughly halfway from Hartington it began to fall sharply at 1 in 60 and would continue to do so into Ashbourne. From Alsop to the next station at Tissington the fall was at 1 in 71.

Two years after the line opened, a train of six-wheeled carriages became derailed by snow and was marooned for three days, during which time the crew were given hot food and drinks by local farmers.

In common with the other stations on this line, the platforms and buildings were of timber construction. From Parsley Hay to Ashbourne the line was single with passing loops at the stations, though provision was made for doubling which never occurred.

Regular passenger services ended in 1954, though excursions continued until 1963. Freight continued until October of that year, the track to Ashbourne finally being lifted in 1964.

Nottingham High School used the station shortly after its closure in the mid 60's as a geography field centre, using the station buildings as accommodation for the students.

The site today
The track bed from Ashbourne to Parsley Hay was acquired by Derbyshire County Council and the Peak District National Park in 1968 for a cycle and walking route. This, the Tissington Trail, was one of the first of such ventures in the country. Later, Ashbourne Tunnel was acquired by Sustrans.

Route

See also
 Cromford and High Peak Railway

References
 Bentley, J.M., Fox, G.K., (1997) Railways of the High Peak: Buxton to Ashbourne (Scenes From The Past series 32), Romiley: Foxline Publishing
 
 
 
 Station on navigable O.S. map

External links
Tissington & High Peak Trails - access and facilities
The Pennine Bridleway

Disused railway stations in Derbyshire
Peak District
Railway stations in Great Britain opened in 1899
Railway stations in Great Britain closed in 1963
Former London and North Western Railway stations
1899 establishments in England